WXIL (My 95 FM) is a radio station broadcasting a contemporary hit radio format. Licensed to Elizabeth, West Virginia, United States, it serves the Parkersburg-Marietta, WV-OH area.  The station is currently owned by Burbach Of WV, LLC.

My 95 is one of six radio stations owned by Results Radio's Parkersburg, WV cluster. Its sister stations include WGGE, WHBR-FM, WRZZ, WLYQ, and WVNT.

Results Radio also has a radio station cluster in Fairmont, West Virginia

External links
 95xil.com

XIL
Contemporary hit radio stations in the United States